Ronald Joseph Marciniak (July 16, 1932 – March 23, 2020) was an American gridiron football player, coach, and scout. He played professionally as a guard in the National Football League (NFL) for the Washington Redskins and in the Canadian Football League (CFL) for the Toronto Argonauts. Marciniak was the head football coach at the University of Dayton from 1973 to 1976. He played college football at Kansas State University.

Early years
Marciniak attended St. George High School in Pittsburgh, where he practiced football and wrestling. He accepted a football scholarship from Kansas State University. He received All-Big Eight honors at guard in 1954.

In 1995, he was inducted into the Pennsylvania Sports Hall of Fame.

Professional career
Marciniak was selected by the Washington Redskins in the seventh round (80th overall) of the 1955 NFL Draft. He played one season of professional football as an offensive guard for the Redskins in the National Football League. He played one season with the Toronto Argonauts in the Canadian Football League.

In 1957, Marciniak served as a player/coach for the Fort Bliss football team while he was a lieutenant in the United States Army. His collegiate coaching career began as an assistant at the University of Arizona (1959–1966). Marciniak  then coached at Southern Illinois University Carbondale (1967–1968), the University of Tulsa (1969), Northwestern University (1970–1972), the University of Miami (1977–1978), and the University of Colorado Boulder (1979–1981). He served as the head football coach at the University of Dayton from 1973 to 1976, compiling a record of 17–26–/.

In 1982, harciniak  worked for the NFL Scouting Combine. In 1983, he was hired as a football scout by the Dallas Cowboys. In 1996, he was hired as a Baltimore Ravens scout. He was credited for the phrase "Play like a Raven" and the label "red-star player" for special on- and off-field qualities. He earned a Super Bowl ring with the Ravens in 2001.

Personal life
Marciniak died on March 23, 2020.

Head coaching record

References

External links
 

1932 births
2020 deaths
American football offensive guards
Arizona Wildcats football coaches
Baltimore Ravens scouts
Cleveland Browns scouts
Colorado Buffaloes football coaches
Dallas Cowboys scouts
Dayton Flyers football coaches
Kansas State Wildcats football players
Miami Hurricanes football coaches
Northwestern Wildcats football coaches
Southern Illinois Salukis football coaches
Toronto Argonauts players
Tulsa Golden Hurricane football coaches
Washington Redskins players
Sportspeople from Pittsburgh
Coaches of American football from Pennsylvania
Players of American football from Pittsburgh
Players of Canadian football from Pittsburgh